Germany-Nigeria relations are the bilateral relations between the Federal Republic of Germany and Federal Republic of Nigeria. Nigeria operates a Embassy in Berlin and Germany operates a Embassy in Abuja. Germany has a Consulate-General in Lagos and Nigeria has a Consulate-General in Frankfurt.

History
German-Nigerian relations go back over 160 years to the period of Colonial Nigeria.

Chancellor Angela Merkel was the first head of state outside Africa to visit Nigeria after Goodluck Johnathan's election in 2011. Muhammadu Buhari visited Elmau, Germany, to attend the 41st G7 summit in 2015. It was his first visit to a country outside of Africa since his election.

In 2019, the German consulate in Lagos called for increased spending on Nigeria's infrastructure to facilitate better trade between Nigeria and Germany. Later that year, President Buhari signed a deal with German energy company, Siemens, to generate at least 25,000 megawatts of electricity for Nigeria's electric grid by 2025.

Culture
Germany founded a Goethe-Institut in Lagos in 1962. In 2021, German Minister of Culture announced they would be returning hundreds of art objects to Nigeria that were looted from the Benin Royal Palace in 1897.

Business
The Nigerian-German Chamber of Commerce was created in 1986 for fostering bilateral trade between Germany and Nigeria and has since deepened economic ties between the two countries.

In 2011, the German-Nigerian Binational Commission was created to bolster cooperation in business, education, energy, migration issues and culture. Germany has started various projects in Nigeria meant to assist the Nigerian government. In 2020, the German government pledged 100 million euros for Borno State to assist with droughts and food shortages, due to the shrinking of Lake Chad. The government has also assisted in training the Nigerian Armed Forces to fight Boko Haram. Germany has supported Nigeria's fight in eradicating polio, which was eradicated from Nigeria in 2021.

Trade
Nigeria, as of 2019, was Germany's second-largest trading partner in Sub-Saharan Africa.

In 2019, Germany exported US$1.2 Billion worth of goods to Nigeria. Top exports from Germany to Nigeria include Rubber working machinery and cars. Nigeria in 2019 exported US$2.6 billion worth of goods to Germany, with the most common export being crude petroleum followed by cocoa.

Immigration
As of 2021, there are about 83,000 Nigerians living in Germany; Nigerians have very high rates of employment in Germany among refugees, second only to Pakistanis.

See also 

 Foreign relations of Germany
 Foreign relations of Nigeria

Notes and references 

 
Nigeria
Bilateral relations of Nigeria